"Baby Come Back" is a song by the British-American rock band Player. It was released in late 1977 as the lead single from their 1977 self-titled debut album, and was the breakthrough single for the band, gaining them mainstream success, hitting #1 on the US Billboard Hot 100 and #10 on the R&B charts in 1978. Their biggest hit single, the song was written and performed by Peter Beckett and J.C. Crowley, the founders of Player.

As reported on the American Top 40 replay broadcast of November 5, 1977, "Baby Come Back" was written after two of the band members had broken up with their girlfriends.

Personnel
Peter Beckett – lead vocals and backing vocals, electric guitar
J.C. Crowley – acoustic piano, electric piano and backing vocals
Ronn Moss – bass and backing vocals
John Friesen – drums, maracas and congas
additional personnel
Wayne Cook – synthesizers, clavinet and electric piano

Cover versions
Lisa Stansfield, in 1997, released the song as a bonus track on the Japanese version of her self-titled album.

Alternative rock band Lazlo Bane, in 2007, covered the song for their covers album Guilty Pleasures.

In 2018, Australian band Ocean Alley included it as part of the "Like a Version" segment on the Australian radio station Triple J. The cover reached #16 on Triple J's Hottest 100 of 2018 and was certified gold by the Australian Recording Industry Association (ARIA).

Uses in other media

In 2011, it was the source of a parody by Chicago artist, Magic 1, entitled "Cutty Come Back", which alludes to the Chicago Bears' woes without quarterback Jay Cutler.

The song is also used in the Michael Bay blockbuster Transformers, when the Autobot Bumblebee communicates with its new owner Sam Witwicky through songs on the radio. In this case, after an incident with the girl he is attracted to, Mikaela, gets out of the car and Sam tries to persuade her to "come back". The lyrics of the song are expected to accomplish this desire, as laid out by the filmmakers, though it is unlikely given the context that she would actually come back anyway.

Actress/singer Vanessa Hudgens sampled the song for her 2006 debut single "Come Back to Me", from her debut album V.

In The Simpsons episode "Homer Alone", when Homer calls the "Department of Missing Babies" after losing Maggie, the hold music is a newly recorded version of the song, by Peter Beckett and J.C. Crowley.

This song was sung by Hank Hill and Elroy "Lucky" Kleinschmidt in the Point After Lounge in the "Church Hopping" episode of King of the Hill.

The song was sung by Steve Smith (Scott Grimes) in the American Dad! episode "The Unbrave One".

In a May 2014 episode of General Hospital, precocious Spencer Cassadine attempted to woo back Emma Scorpio-Drake by hiring Player to perform the song at the Nurses Ball. Spencer's great-grandmother Lesley Webber was supposedly a groupie of the band in the 1970s.

In 2016, Peter Beckett performed a parody "Brady Come Back" on The Herd with Colin Cowherd about the return of New England Patriots quarterback Tom Brady from suspension.

In 2018, Rapper Yung Gravy sampled the song in his single "Cheryl"

In 2022 this song is played in the movie Black Adam.

Chart performance

Weekly charts

Year-end charts

All-time charts

References

Bibliography
Joel Whitburn's Presents Top R&B/Hip-Hop Singles: 1942-2004, 2004, Record Research Inc.,

External links
 

1977 songs
1977 debut singles
Player (band) songs
Billboard Hot 100 number-one singles
Cashbox number-one singles
RPM Top Singles number-one singles
RSO Records singles
Songs written by Peter Beckett
Torch songs
Philips Records singles
Songs written by J.C. Crowley